Christopher Plunkett is the name of:

 Christopher Plunkett, 1st Baron of Dunsany (c. 1410-c. 1463), Irish peer
 Christopher Plunkett, 2nd Earl of Fingall (died 1649), Irish peer